Boulevard is a 2014 American drama film directed by Dito Montiel and written by Douglas Soesbe. Starring Robin Williams, Kathy Baker, Roberto Aguire, Eleonore Hendricks, Giles Matthey, and Bob Odenkirk, the film premiered at the Tribeca Film Festival on April 20, 2014. The film was released on July 10, 2015 in a limited release by Starz Digital.

Plot
Nolan Mack has worked at the same bank for almost 26 years in a life of monotony. He and his wife, Joy, have embraced their marriage as a convenient and comfortable distraction from facing reality. What starts as an aimless drive down an unfamiliar street turns into a life-altering decision for Nolan when he meets a troubled young hustler named Leo on his drive home from visiting his ailing father at a hospital.

Nolan begins to seek Leo out and spend time with him. As Nolan spends more time with Leo, he finds himself breaking from the confines of his old life and come to terms with who he really is. He begins to behave out of character, oversleeping, and missing important meetings.

Nolan attempts to help Leo escape the life of prostitution by getting him a job, which he fails to show up for. He also encourages him to return to school and offers to help him financially. One day, Leo shows up at Nolan's workplace asking for help. Nolan walks Leo out of the building and is confronted by Leo's pimp, demanding $3,200. During the conflict, the bank's patrons are observing Nolan, Leo and the pimp in the parking lot and someone calls the police. The police show up and escort the pimp away in handcuffs. Nolan then takes Leo back to his house, as his wife is out of town on business. Leo leaves the home sometime after Nolan falls asleep. Joy arrives home from her business trip early and wakes Nolan up.

Soon thereafter, Nolan and his wife are preparing to have dinner with the regional bank manager and the local branch manager regarding a potential promotion for Nolan. Prior to leaving for the dinner, Nolan receives a phone call and leaves. He tells Joy to go on to the dinner and that he'll meet her there. Nolan arrives at the hospital, where Leo is recovering from an overdose. Nolan is directed to Leo's room by a doctor, only to realize that Leo is no longer there. The hospital staff believe that Leo checked himself out and left. Nolan starts looking around town for Leo. He goes to his apartment and the place that they met, but he never finds him. While searching for Leo, Nolan has missed the business dinner. He decides to return home and arrives to find an angry Joy waiting for him. She asks why he never showed up and indicates that she knows Nolan is having an affair with a man. Nolan tells her that he wants to leave the marriage. Joy says that she would like to keep their life the same, while Nolan says that he's ready to live in the real world and stop pretending that he is someone that he is not.

Nolan packs up and quits his job, tells his best friend that he is moving to New York City, and meets a man, presumably on a date, in a cafe. Joy appears to move on as well, taking a cruise as she has always wanted to.

Cast
 Robin Williams as Nolan Mack
 Kathy Baker as Joy Mack
 Roberto Aguire as Leo
 Bob Odenkirk as Winston
 Eleonore Hendricks as Patty
 Giles Matthey as Eddie
 Henry Haggard as Beaumont
 Gary Gardner as Lionel Mack, Nolan's father
 J. Karen Thomas as Cat
 Sondra Morton as Gloria Beaumont
 Jerry Chipman as Blyden
 Joshua Decker as ER Doctor
 Brandon Hirsch as Brad
 Landon Marshall as Mark

Production
Screenwriter Douglas Soesbe underwent a similar coming out experience, telling Creative Screenwriting, "I came out very late and with a great deal of guilt. This movie is not about me, but I really understand that character." Soesbe wrote the first draft of the screenplay, which was set in Los Angeles, 10 years earlier, and because of its subject matter did not expect it to ever be produced. When producers showed interest in the project, Soesbe rewrote the script to set the story in a small town that would be "more constricted than Los Angeles."

Release
After its premiere at Tribeca Film Festival in 2014, it found distribution from Starz Digital, and was released in theaters on July 10, 2015. The film went on to screen at the Frameline Film Festival, the Miami LGBT Film Festival, Montclair Film Festival, and the Seattle International Film Festival.

Critical reception
Boulevard received mixed reviews from critics. On Rotten Tomatoes, the film has a rating of 52%, based on 73 reviews, with an average rating of 5.57/10. The site's critical consensus reads, "Boulevard features a richly layered performance from Robin Williams, but that may be this dour drama's sole distinctive feature." On Metacritic, the film has a score of 52 out of 100, based on 22 critics, indicating "mixed or average reviews".

IGN awarded the film a score of 7.0 out of 10, saying "It doesn't offer Williams doing any truly brilliant bits of comedy, nor is it a role that is destined to be iconic, but it fits."

References

External links
 
 
 
 

2014 films
2014 drama films
2014 LGBT-related films
Films directed by Dito Montiel
American drama films
American independent films
American LGBT-related films
Films about dysfunctional families
Films shot in Tennessee
LGBT-related drama films
2010s English-language films
2010s American films